Nine ships of the Royal Navy have been named HMS Plymouth after the port of Plymouth in Devon:

  was a 60-gun ship launched in 1653. She was rebuilt in 1705 with 64 guns, but foundered later that year.
  was a sheer hulk purchased in 1689 and broken up in 1730.
  was a 60-gun fourth rate launched in 1708. She was rebuilt in 1722 and broken up in 1764.
  was a 6-gun yacht launched in 1755 and broken up in 1793.
  was a transport launched in 1778 and sunk as a breakwater in 1815.
  was an 8-gun transport built in 1786 and sold in 1815.
  was an 8-gun yacht launched in 1796 and broken up in 1830.
  was a  launched in 1959. She was paid off in 1988 and preserved as a museum ship at Birkenhead until 2014, then sold for scrap.

See also

References
 

Royal Navy ship names